In the Vedic tradition, sóma (Devanagari: सोम) is a ritual drink of importance among the early Vedic Indo-Aryans. The Rigveda mentions it, particularly in the Soma Mandala. Gita mentions the drink in Chapter 9. It is equivalent to the Iranian haoma.

The texts describe the preparation of soma by means of extracting the juice from a plant, the identity of which is now unknown and debated among scholars. Both in the ancient religions of Historical Vedic religion and Zoroastrianism, the name of the drink and the plant are not exactly the same.

There has been much speculation about the most likely identity of the original plant. Traditional Indian accounts, such as those from practitioners of Ayurveda, Siddha medicine, and Somayajna called Somayajis, identify the plant as "Somalata" (Sarcostemma acidum).
Non-Indian researchers have proposed candidates including the fly agaric, Amanita muscaria; Psilocybin mushrooms, Psilocybe cubensis; wild or Syrian rue, Peganum harmala; and ma huang, Ephedra sinica.

Etymology
Soma is a Vedic Sanskrit word that literally means "distill, extract, sprinkle", often connected in the context of rituals.

Soma's Avestan cognate is the haoma. According to Geldner (1951), the word is derived from Indo-Iranian roots *sav- (Sanskrit sav-/su) "to press", i.e. *sau-ma- is the drink prepared by pressing the stalks of a plant, but the word and the related practices were borrowed by the Indo-Aryans from the Bactria–Margiana culture (BMAC). Although the word is only attested in Indo-Iranian traditions, Manfred Mayrhofer has proposed a Proto-Indo-European origin from the root *.

Origins

The Indo-Aryans were speakers of a branch of the Indo-European language family, which originated in the Sintashta culture and further developed into the Andronovo culture, which in turn developed out of the Kurgan culture of the Central Asian steppes. The Vedic beliefs and practices of the pre-classical era were closely related to the hypothesised Proto-Indo-European religion, and show relations with rituals from the Andronovo culture, from which the Indo-Aryan people descended. According to Anthony, the Old Indic religion probably emerged among Indo-European immigrants in the contact zone between the Zeravshan River (present-day Uzbekistan) and (present-day) Iran. It was "a syncretic mixture of old Central Asian and new Indo-European elements" which borrowed "distinctive religious beliefs and practices" from the Bactria–Margiana culture (BMAC). This syncretic influence is supported by at least 383 non-Indo-European words that were borrowed from this culture, including the god Indra and the ritual drink Soma. According to Anthony,

Vedic soma

In the Vedas, the same word (soma) is used for the drink, the plant, and its deity. Drinking soma produces immortality (Amrita, Rigveda 8.48.3). Indra and Agni are portrayed as consuming soma in copious quantities. In the vedic ideology, Indra drank large amounts of soma while fighting the serpent demon Vritra. The consumption of soma by human beings is well attested in Vedic ritual. The Soma Mandala of the Rigveda is completely dedicated to Soma Pavamana, and is focused on a moment in the ritual when the soma is pressed, strained, mixed with water and milk, and poured into containers. These actions are described as a representation of a variety of things, including a king conquering territory, the Sun's journey through the cosmos, or a bull running to mate with cows (represented by the milk). The most important myth about Soma is about his theft. In it, Soma was originally held captive in a citadel in heaven by the archer Kṛśānu. A falcon stole Soma, successfully escaping Kṛśānu, and delivered Soma to Manu, the first sacrificer. Additionally, Soma is associated with the moon in the late Rigveda and Middle Vedic period. Sūryā, the daughter of the Sun, is sometimes stated to be the wife of Soma.

The Rigveda (8.48.3) says:

Stephanie W. Jamison and Joel P. Brereton translates this as:

Also, consider Rigveda (8.79.2-6) regarding the power of Soma:
"...He covers the naked and heals all who are sick.  The blind man sees; the lame man steps forth....Let those who seek find what they seek: let them receive the treasure....Let him find what was lost before; let him push forward the man of truth...."
Such is indicative of an experience with an entheogen of some source...(Michael Wood (historian)).(The Story of India)

Avestan haoma

The finishing of haoma in Zoroastrianism may be glimpsed from the Avesta (particularly in the Hōm Yast, Yasna 9), and Avestan language *hauma also survived as Middle Persian hōm. The plant haoma yielded the essential ingredient for the ritual drink, parahaoma.

In Yasna 9.22, haoma grants "speed and strength to warriors, excellent and righteous sons to those giving birth, spiritual power and knowledge to those who apply themselves to the study of the nasks". As the religion's chief cult divinity he came to be perceived as its divine priest. In Yasna 9.26, Ahura Mazda is said to have invested him with the sacred girdle, and in Yasna 10.89, to have installed haoma as the "swiftly sacrificing zaotar" (Sanskrit hotar) for himself and the Amesha Spenta.

Post-Vedic mentions

Soma has been mentioned in Chapter 9, verse 20 of Bhagavad Gita:

The Maharishi Mahesh Yogi's Transcendental Meditation-Sidhi Program involves a notion of "soma", said to be based on the Rigveda.

Candidates for the plant 

There has been much speculation as to the original Sauma plant. Candidates that have been suggested include honey, mushrooms, psychoactive and other herbal plants.

When the ritual of somayajna is held today in South India by the traditional Srautas called Somayajis, the plant used is the somalatha (Sanskrit: soma creeper, Sarcostemma acidum) which is procured as a leafless vine.

Since the late 18th century, when Abraham Hyacinthe Anquetil-Duperron and others made portions of the Avesta available to western scholars, several scholars have sought a representative botanical equivalent of the haoma as described in the texts and as used in living Zoroastrian practice. In the late 19th century, the highly conservative Zoroastrians of Yazd (Iran) were found to use ephedra, which was locally known as hum or homa and which they exported to the Indian Zoroastrians.

During the colonial British era scholarship, cannabis was proposed as the soma candidate by Jogesh Chandra Ray, The Soma Plant (1939) and by B. L. Mukherjee (1921).

In the late 1960s, several studies attempted to establish soma as a psychoactive substance. A number of proposals were made, including one in 1968 by the American banker R. Gordon Wasson, an amateur ethnomycologist, who asserted that soma was an inebriant but not cannabis, and suggested fly-agaric mushroom, Amanita muscaria, as the likely candidate. Since its introduction in 1968, this theory has gained both detractors and followers in the anthropological literature. Wasson and his co-author, Wendy Doniger O'Flaherty, drew parallels between Vedic descriptions and reports of Siberian uses of the fly-agaric in shamanic ritual.

In 1989 Harry Falk noted that, in the texts, both haoma and soma were said to enhance alertness and awareness, did not coincide with the consciousness altering effects of an entheogen, and that "there is nothing shamanistic or visionary either in early Vedic or in Old Iranian texts", (Falk, 1989) Falk also asserted that the three varieties of ephedra that yield ephedrine (Ephedra gerardiana, E. major procera and E. intermedia) also have the properties attributed to haoma by the texts of the Avesta. (Falk, 1989) At the conclusion of the 1999 Haoma-Soma workshop in Leiden, Jan E. M. Houben writes: "despite strong attempts to do away with ephedra by those who are eager to see sauma as a hallucinogen, its status as a serious candidate for the Rigvedic Soma and Avestan Haoma still stands" (Houben, 2003).

The Soviet archeologist Viktor Sarianidi wrote that he had discovered vessels and mortars used to prepare soma in Zoroastrian temples in the Bactria–Margiana Archaeological Complex. He said that the vessels have revealed residues and seed impressions left behind during the preparation of soma. This has not been sustained by subsequent investigations. Alternatively Mark Merlin, who revisited the subject of the identity of soma more than thirty years after originally writing about it stated that there is a need of further study on links between soma and Papaver somniferum. (Merlin, 2008).

In his book Food of the Gods, ethnobotanist Terence McKenna postulates that the most likely candidate for soma is the mushroom Psilocybe cubensis, a hallucinogenic mushroom that grows in cow dung in certain climates. McKenna cites both Wasson's and his own unsuccessful attempts using Amanita muscaria to reach a psychedelic state as evidence that it could not have inspired the worship and praise of soma. McKenna further points out that the 9th mandala of the Rig Veda makes extensive references to the cow as the embodiment of soma.

According to Michael Wood, the references to immortality and light are characteristics of an entheogenic experience.

See also
 Haoma - an equivalent divine plant in Zoroastrianism
 Mead
 Sima (mead)
 Soma drug - carisoprodol

Notes

References

Sources

 

Bakels, C.C. 2003. “The contents of ceramic vessels in the Bactria-Margiana Archaeological Complex, Turkmenistan.” in Electronic Journal of Vedic Studies, Vol. 9. Issue 1c (May 2003)
 

 

Jay, Mike. Blue Tide: The Search for Soma. Autonomedia, 1999.

 

Lamborn Wilson, Peter. Ploughing the clouds:The search for Irish Soma, City Lights,1999.

McDonald, A. "A botanical perspective on the identity of soma (Nelumbo nucifera Gaertn.) based on scriptural and iconographic records" in Economic Botany 2004;58

 

 
Entheogens
Herbal and fungal hallucinogens
Historical drinks
Libation
Mythological food and drink